The Sheriff of Lorn/Lorne was historically the royal official responsible for enforcing law and order in Lorne, Scotland and bringing criminals to justice. The sheriffdom was created in 1293 by King John of Scotland in an effort to maintain peace in the western reaches of his realm. Dunollie Castle was the seat of the sheriff.

Sheriffs of Lorn 

Alasdair Mac Dubhghaill 1293-1306 
Archibald Campbell, 7th Earl of Argyll c.1610
Archibald Campbell, 1st Marquess of Argyll

Citations and References
Citations

Reference

Sheriff courts
Argyll and Bute